The 1935 Temple Owls football team was an American football team that represented Temple University as an independent during the 1935 college football season. In its third season under head coach Pop Warner, the team compiled a 7–3 record and outscored opponents by a total of 181 to 68. After winning their first six games, the Owls then lost three of their last four games. The team played its home games at Temple Stadium in Philadelphia.

Schedule

References

Temple
Temple Owls football seasons
Temple Owls football